The 2018 FINA Swimming World Cup was a series of seven three-day meets in seven different cities between September and November 2018. This edition integrated meets held in 25m-pool (short course) as well as meets in 50m-pool (long course).

Meets
The 2018 World Cup consisted of the following seven meets, which were divided into three clusters.

World Cup standings
 Composition of points:
 Best performances (by meets): 1st place: 24 points, 2nd place: 18 points and 3rd place: 12 points;
 Points for medals (in individual events): gold medal: 12 points, silver medal: 9 points and bronze medal: 6 points;
 Bonus for world record (WR): 20 points.

Men

Women

Event winners

50m freestyle

100m freestyle

200m freestyle

400m freestyle

1500m (men) / 800m (women) freestyle

50m backstroke

100m backstroke

200m backstroke

50m breaststroke

100m breaststroke

200m breaststroke

50m butterfly

100m butterfly

200m butterfly

100m individual medley

200m individual medley

400m individual medley

4 × 50m mixed relays

4 × 100m mixed relays

References

FINA Swimming World Cup
FINA Swimming World Cup